Wellendorff  is a family-owned German manufacturer of jewellery headquartered in Pforzheim, Baden-Württemberg.

History 

The manufactory was established in 1893 by Ernst Alexander Wellendorff and is now ran by his great-great grandchildren.

The Wellendorff rope first appeared in 1977, its recipe unchanging through the years. Christoph Wellendorff claims that their jewellery cannot be replicated exactly how they craft it. Since 1993 the company has produced a collection of cold enamel jewellery and rings.

References

External links 
Official site

German brands
German jewellers
Jewellery companies of Germany
Companies based in Baden-Württemberg
Pforzheim